Lapua Cathedral is a church in Lapua, Finland, and the seat of the Diocese of Lapua. The neoclassical cathedral was designed by Carl Ludvig Engel and built in 1827. The cathedral's pipe organ is the largest in Finland.

External links 

Carl Ludvig Engel buildings
Lutheran cathedrals in Finland
Cathedral
Churches completed in 1827
Buildings and structures in South Ostrobothnia
Tourist attractions in South Ostrobothnia
1827 establishments in the Russian Empire
Neoclassical church buildings in Finland